Géza Balkay (5 September 1952 – 3 April 2006) was a Hungarian television and film actor. He appeared in more than 40 films and television shows between 1976 and 2006. He starred in The Summer Guest, which was screened in the Un Certain Regard section at the 1992 Cannes Film Festival.

Selected filmography
Red Heat (1988) - Colonel Kulikov
The Summer Guest (1992)

References

External links

1952 births
2006 deaths
Hungarian male film actors
Male actors from Budapest
20th-century Hungarian male actors